Osteochilus longidorsalis is a species of fish in the family Cyprinidae. Its common names are hiffin carp and long finned barb.

It is endemic to the Western Ghats (India) and only found in Chalakudy River and Periyar River in Kerala. Locally it is called Kuruva Paral in Malayalam. It inhabits torrential streams and is often found in pool, riffles, and cascades. They account for the largest amount of catches in fishing baits due to their abundance.

References

External links

Osteochilus
Taxa named by Rohan Pethiyagoda
Taxa named by Maurice Kottelat
Fish described in 1994
Freshwater fish of India
Endemic fauna of the Western Ghats
Chalakudy
Periyar (river)
Fauna of Kerala